Kamal Sowah (born 9 January 2000) is a Ghanaian professional footballer who plays as a midfielder for Belgian club Club Brugge and the Ghana national team.

Club career

Leicester City 
After a successful trial, Sowah signed his first professional contract with Leicester City on 31 January 2018, tying him to the club until the summer of 2022. Later that same day Sowah was loaned to Oud-Heverlee Leuven, a club also owned by King Power, for one and a half seasons to gain more experience. Sowah played his first match on 14 April 2018, coming on as a substitute for Joeri Dequevy in a 2–0 win at Waasland-Beveren. On 23 August 2019, Sowah scored his first two professional goals in a 6–0 victory against RFC Wetteren in the Belgian Cup.

Club Brugge 
On 27 August 2021, Sowah joined Club Brugge for an undisclosed fee.

Loan to AZ
On 31 January 2022, Sowah was loaned to AZ in Dutch Eredivisie until the end of the season.

In the 2022-2023 season he came back to Club Brugge. This time with better performances with even goals in the UEFA Champions League.

Career statistics

Honours 
Club Brugge
 Belgian Pro League: 2021–22
 Belgian Super Cup: 2022

References

2000 births
Living people
Ghanaian Muslims
Ghanaian footballers
Association football defenders
Leicester City F.C. players
Oud-Heverlee Leuven players
Club Brugge KV players
AZ Alkmaar players
Belgian Pro League players
Challenger Pro League players
Eredivisie players
Ghanaian expatriate footballers
Expatriate footballers in England
Ghanaian expatriate sportspeople in England
Expatriate footballers in Belgium
Ghanaian expatriate sportspeople in Belgium
Expatriate footballers in the Netherlands
Ghanaian expatriate sportspeople in the Netherlands
2022 FIFA World Cup players